The Mount McKinley National Park Headquarters District in Alaska, United States, in what is now called Denali National Park was the original  administrative center of the park.  It contains an extensive collection of National Park Service Rustic structures, primarily designed by the National Park Service's Branch of Plans and Designs in the 1930s.

In 1920, the newly created park received funding to hire staff and establish an administrative area. When the Alaska Railroad reached the park in 1922, park headquarters were moved from the community of Nenana to a location near the new railroad station within the park boundaries. In the fall of 1925, park headquarters were moved to its current location. By 1927, nine structures, including those moved from the original site, occupied the headquarters district.

As the hub of park administrative and management, the headquarters area expanded according to detailed plans provided by the Branch of Plans and Design. As in many of the national parks during the Depression, the Civilian Conservation Corps had an important role in the development of conservation and recreation-oriented projects within the park as a whole and headquarters district in particular. Beginning in 1938, CCC accomplished many projects within the park, but most of their efforts focused on the headquarters area where they constructed sewer and water lines, roads, and buildings.

Contributing properties
When first listed, the historical district contains a total of 14 contributing properties, built between 1926 and 1941.  It was enlarged in 2018.
Office Building, also known as the Old Museum, built 1926.
Warehouse, actually hosting the Museum , built 1928.
Barn, also known as the Old Sign Shop, built 1928-1929.
Dog Feed Cache and Sled Storage, comprising dog houses and kennels , built 1929-1930.
Electric Light Plant (Power House), also known as the Engineer Office, built 1930-1931.
Garage, also known as the Ranger Cache, built 1931.
Comfort Station, also known as the "John House", built 1932.
Boiler House, also known as the Plumbing Shop, built 1932.
Rangers' Dormitory, also known as the Administration Building, built 1934-1935.
Employee Residences, two buildings, both built 1938.
Superintendent's Garage , built 1939.
Garage and Repair Shop, also known as the Carpenter Shop, built 1939.
Employee's Residence, also known as the Superintendent's Residence, built 1940-1941.

References

External links

Buildings and structures in Denali National Park and Preserve
Civilian Conservation Corps in Alaska
Historic American Buildings Survey in Alaska
Historic districts on the National Register of Historic Places in Alaska
Office buildings in Alaska
Park buildings and structures on the National Register of Historic Places in Alaska
Roadside attractions in Alaska
Rustic architecture in Alaska
National Register of Historic Places in Denali National Park and Preserve
Buildings and structures on the National Register of Historic Places in Denali Borough, Alaska
National Park Service Rustic architecture